This is a list of diplomatic missions of Saint Lucia. Saint Lucia has a modest number of diplomatic missions appropriate to the country's size. Its embassy and mission to the European Union in Brussels and its embassy in Morocco is shared with other East Caribbean states.

Africa
 
 Rabat (Embassy)

Americas

 Toronto (Consulate General)

 Havana (Embassy)

 Washington, D.C. (Embassy)
 Miami (Consulate General)
 New York City (Consulate General)

Asia

 Taipei (Embassy)

Europe

 Brussels (Embassy)

 Fort-de-France, Martinique (Consulate General)

 London (High Commission)

Multilateral organisations
 
Brussels (Mission)
 
New York City (Permanent Mission)
 
Paris (Permanent Mission)
 
Washington, D.C. (Permanent Mission)

Gallery

See also
 Foreign relations of Saint Lucia

References

External links
Government of Saint Lucia: Overseas missions

Diplomatic missions
Saint Lucia